Clavulina puiggarii is a species of coral fungus in the family Clavulinaceae. It is found in Australia and Brazil.

References

External links

Fungi described in 1881
Fungi of Australia
Fungi of South America
puiggarii
Taxa named by Carlo Luigi Spegazzini